Leander (also Leandre) is an unincorporated community in Vernon Parish, Louisiana, United States. Its ZIP code is 71438.

Leander did not participate in the 2010 census.

1953 tornado
On December 3, 1953, a tornado clipped the northwest side of town, causing tremendous damage with four homes incurring F4-level damage. Seven people were killed, and 20 others were injured.

References 

Unincorporated communities in Vernon Parish, Louisiana
Unincorporated communities in Louisiana